Henry Blair Mayne (23 August 1813 – 17 January 1892) was an English lawyer and amateur cricketer who played first-class cricket between 1833 and 1849.

Life
Mayne was born at Limpsfield in Surrey in 1813, the son of the Rev. Robert Mayne and his wife Charlotte. He was educated at Westminster School and Christ Church, Oxford where he matriculated in 1831, graduating B.A. in 1835, M.A. in 1838. At school Mayne was a rower, continuing to row at stroke at Christ Church where he also played cricket for the University side. He studied law at the Middle Temple and was called to the bar in 1845. From 1850 he served as a Clerk in the Private Bills Office of the House of Commons, becoming the Head of the office in 1870.

Mayne was also notable as one of the group which helped to write the rules of Short Whist. He died at Brighton in Sussex in January 1892 aged 78.

Cricketer
Mayne played in 18 first-class cricket matches between 1833 and 1849, for a variety of teams. He made his first-class debut in 1833 for the Gentlemen of Kent before playing four times for Oxford University between 1834 and 1838. He played for a Kent team in 1835, before the foundation of the County Club, and went on to play once for Kent County Cricket Club in 1844. He made seven appearances for MCC, four for the Gentlemen of Kent and one for the Gentlemen of England. He played regularly in club cricket for I Zingari and MCC as well as for other sides, including Bramshill in Hampshire.

Notes

References

External links

1813 births
1892 deaths
English cricketers
Kent cricketers
Oxford University cricketers
Marylebone Cricket Club cricketers
Gentlemen of Kent cricketers
Gentlemen of England cricketers
People educated at Westminster School, London
Alumni of Christ Church, Oxford
English barristers
19th-century English lawyers